Big Brother Brasil 15 is the fifteenth season of Big Brother Brasil which premiered January 20, 2015 on the Rede Globo television network.

The show is produced by Endemol Globo and presented by news reporter Pedro Bial. The season is officially confirmed since March 2012 as part of a millionaire contract between international Endemol and Rede Globo, which guaranteed the show's rights until 2016.

The grand prize is R$1.5 million with tax allowances, with a R$150,000 prize offered to the runner up and a R$50,000 prize offered to the 3rd place. Cézar Lima won this season on Day 78.

The game

Rules changes
This season, the Head of Household back to be eligible to compete in the next HoH competition after his leadership, having the chance to be HoH multiple times in a row. Also, he/she gains R$10.000, the Power of No and the right to divide the housemates into two teams for the Food competition. However, for the first time since BBB started, the HoH has no immunity in the nominations, becoming vulnerable to being nominated by the house vote.

You're in  control!
Big Brother introduced a new way to give more power to the audience, calling it Você no Controle. Every week, producers pose a question and the public must vote between two options. The voting usually is opened on Friday and finishes on Sunday.

Power of No

Big Phone

Housemates
The cast list with the first 13 housemates was unveiled on January 13, 2015. On day 2, two potential competitors (Aline and Julia) entered the house in order to compete by public vote for the 14th housemate's spot.

(ages stated at time of contest)

Future Appearances

In 2021, Angélica Ramos appeared in No Limite 5, she finished the competition in 15th place.

Voting history

Notes

Have and Have-Nots

On week 5, due to a punishment, all housemates were moved to the Have-Not group.

On week 7, Luan was automatically moved to the Have-Not group due to a punishment. In the same week, Cézar originally was part of the Have-Not group, but was moved to the Have group in a draw after the Tamires' withdrawal.

On week 8, due to a completed task, all housemates became Have for the rest of week.

References

External links
 Official Site 

2015 Brazilian television seasons
15